Runa was a  cargo ship that was built in 1944 as Eichberg by Van der Giessen, Krimpen aan den IJssel, Netherlands for German owners. She was seized by the Allies in April 1945, passed to the Ministry of War Transport (MoWT) and renamed Empire Consent. In 1949, Empire Consent was sold into merchant service and renamed Runa. In 1964, she was sold to Greek owners and renamed Karyatis, serving until 1968 when she was scrapped.

Description
The ship was built by Van der Giessen, Krimpen aan den IJssel. She was launched in 1944.

The ship had a GRT of 1,942 and a NRT of 964.

The engine was built by Verschure & Co Scheepswerk en Maschinenfabriek, Amsterdam.

History
Eichburg was built for August Bolten Wm. Miller's Nachfolger, Hamburg. On 23 November 1944, she was damaged by a mine in the Baltic Sea. She was seized by the Allies in May 1945 at Bremerhaven, passed to the MoWT and renamed Empire Consent. She was placed under the management of Witherington & Everett. Her port of registry was changed to London. The Code Letters GFSW and United Kingdom Official Number 180848 were allocated.

On 11 May 1946, a fire broke out in Empire Consents cargo whilst she was moored in the Alexandra Dock, Hull, Yorkshire. Six people were injured fighting the fire, which took over 24 hours to extinguish. In 1949, Empire Consent was sold to Glen & Co Ltd, Glasgow and was renamed Runa. In 1964, Runa was sold to Seamasters Shipping Co, Greece and was renamed Karyatis. She served until 1968, when she was scrapped in Hong Kong.

References

1944 ships
Ships built in the Netherlands
Steamships of Germany
Ministry of War Transport ships
Empire ships
Steamships of the United Kingdom
World War II merchant ships of the United Kingdom
Merchant ships of the United Kingdom
Steamships of Greece
Merchant ships of Greece